Thorn Lake may refer to:

Thorn Lake (Lake County, Oregon)
Thorn Lake (Portage County, Wisconsin)